Alexander Paul Thomas Stafford (born 19 July 1987) is a British politician who has been the Member of Parliament (MP) for Rother Valley since the 2019 general election. He is the first Conservative to be elected for the seat.  He has been the Vice Chairman of the Conservative Party for Policy since September 2022.

Early life and career
Stafford grew up in Ealing Broadway, was privately educated at St Benedict's School, Ealing, and was part of the Ealing Youth Orchestra and Ealing Youth Choir. His mother was a magistrate and his father worked for a US technology company. His maternal grandmother was a Polish East German refugee, while his maternal grandfather was a Polish Ukrainian refugee who volunteered to serve in the British Army when the Soviet Union joined the Allies, having previously spent time imprisoned in a Siberian Gulag camp.

Stafford studied History at St Benet's Hall, Oxford where he served as president of the Oxford University Conservative Association (in Michaelmas Term of 2007), as president of The Newman Society (in Hilary Term of 2006), and on the executive of the Oxford University Student Union. Before becoming an MP, Stafford worked for Shell, the World Wildlife Fund and Conservative MP Owen Paterson.

Political career
Stafford's political career began when he was elected to Ealing Council in West London, where he has represented the ward of Ealing Broadway since 2014. In November 2019, he was selected as the prospective parliamentary candidate for Rother Valley, a constituency to which he is connected by family ties in Dinnington. He was elected at the 2019 general election, becoming the first non-Labour MP to represent Rother Valley in the 101-year history of the constituency.

Stafford is a member of the Business, Energy and Industrial Strategy Committee and is chair of the All-Party Parliamentary Group on Algeria.

In August 2020, Stafford received criticism for an expenses claim of 9p for a journey of less than a mile, one of seven mileage claims of less than £1 within his first four months of being elected. He also claimed £97 for a rail ticket for his wife from their home in London to his constituency.

In November 2020, Stafford secured and spoke at the first ever parliamentary debate dedicated to hydrogen, and he has expressed his desire to see Rother Valley "turned into Britain’s Hydrogen Valley", adding: "It is clear that the success of the UK's national hydrogen strategy is inextricably linked to its location in the North, particularly in Yorkshire and the Humber."

In January 2022, it was announced that Stafford had been invited to join the Government benches, having been appointed Parliamentary Private Secretary to the Ministry of Defence. This was the first such appointment for a Rother Valley MP since the 1970s. In July 2022, Stafford was appointed Parliamentary Private Secretary to the Prime Minister Boris Johnson, a role requiring him to attend meetings of the Cabinet and aid in the handling of parliamentary affairs within Johnson’s office, including preparations for Prime Minister’s Questions; Stafford responded to the news of his appointment by vowing to "take every opportunity to ensure Rother Valley’s voice is heard at the highest level.”

Political views
Stafford campaigned to leave the European Union during the 2016 referendum.

Stafford has previously named Margaret Thatcher as his political idol, who he believes "was a strong leader who saved the country from where it was headed. Right to buy gave everyone a stake in the country." However, in the midst of the COVID-19 pandemic, Stafford argued for the importance of a "green recovery" which would avoid mistakes made during the premiership of Thatcher: "In the 1980s under Thatcher, the closure of the coal mines, there was a cliff edge, a cut-off, that created lots of social problems and economic problems. We need to manage the transition better. We can't leave anyone behind."

Stafford described himself as belonging to the political tribe of David Cameron and was a supporter of Cameron's Big Society policy "as things like Free Schools give power to local bodies. People know best how to run their own lives." One of Stafford's contributions at Prime Minister's Questions in 2021 was described as that "of a proper old-school Law and Order Tory: tough on crime and anti-social behaviour."

In May 2021 Stafford wrote an essay entitled "Social Conservatism – Turning the Red Wall Blue for Years to Come" for inclusion in Common Sense: Conservative Thinking for a Post-Liberal Age published by the Common Sense Group, an informal group of Conservative MPs.

Stafford endorsed Liz Truss during the July–September 2022 Conservative Party leadership election.

Personal life
Stafford lives in Harthill, a village of his constituency, with his wife Natalie and their daughters Persephone, who was born in April 2020, and Charlotte, who was born in December 2021. His elder brother, Gregory Stafford, is a borough councillor for the Conservative Group in Ealing, representing Hanger Hill ward - and was the former Leader of the Conservative Group in Ealing.

Stafford is a Catholic.

References

External links

1987 births
Living people
Conservative Party (UK) MPs for English constituencies
UK MPs 2019–present
People educated at St Benedict's School, Ealing
Presidents of the Oxford University Conservative Association
Conservative Party (UK) councillors
Councillors in the London Borough of Ealing
21st-century British politicians
English people of Polish descent
English people of Ukrainian descent
English people of German descent
Alumni of St Benet's Hall, Oxford
Parliamentary Private Secretaries to the Prime Minister
British Catholics